is a town located in Gunma Prefecture, Japan. , the town had an estimated population of 41,918 in 19,773 households, and a population density of 2300 persons per km². Approximately 20 percent of the total population are foreign citizens, mostly Japanese Brazilians, who work at many factories in the town. Since 1990, Japanese descendants from foreign countries have been permitted to stay in Japan freely. It is estimated that 15 percent of the population speak Portuguese as their native language, and as of 2007, Ōizumi has the highest concentration of Brazilians of any city in Japan. More recently, Nepalese and other Asians have begun settling in the town.

Geography
Ōizumi is located in the extreme southern corner Gunma prefecture, bordered by Saitama Prefecture to the south. The Tone River flows through the southern part of the town.

Surrounding municipalities
Gunma Prefecture
 Ōta
 Chiyoda
 Ōra
Saitama Prefecture
 Kumagaya

Climate
Ōizumi has a Humid continental climate (Köppen Cfa) characterized by hot summers and cold winters.  The average annual temperature in Ōizumi is 14.5 °C. The average annual rainfall is 1263 mm with September as the wettest month. The temperatures are highest on average in August, at around 26.7 °C, and lowest in January, at around 3.3 °C.

Demographics
Per Japanese census data, the population of Ōizumi has grown significantly over the past 100 years.

History
The villages of Ōkawa and Koizumi were created within Ōra District, Gunma Prefecture on April 1, 1889 with the creation of the modern municipalities system after the Meiji Restoration. Koizumi was elevated to town status on July 25, 1902.  On March 31, 1957 Koizumi merged with the village of Ōkawa and was renamed Ōizumi. Plans to merge with neighboring Chiyoda in 2004 and with Ōta in 2008 were rejected by the local town assembly.

Government
Ōizumi has a mayor-council form of government with a directly elected mayor and a unicameral town council of 14 members. Ōizumi, together with the other municipalities in Ōra District contributes three members to the Gunma Prefectural Assembly. In terms of national politics, the town is part of Gunma 3rd district of the lower house of the Diet of Japan.

Economy
Ōizumi has an industrial base, with manufacturing facilities including plants from Ajinomoto,  Sanyo, Toppan, Maruha Nichiro and Fuji Heavy Industries (which was previously the plant of the Nakajima Aircraft Company), located in the town.

Education
Ōizumi has four public elementary schools and three public middle schools operated by the town government, and two public high schools operated by the Gunma prefecture Board of Education.

International schools:
 Instituto Educacional Centro Nippo-Brasileiro – Brazilian school
 Instituto Educacional Gente Miúda – Brazilian school

The city formerly housed the Escola da Professora Rebeca, another Brazilian international school.

Transportation

Railway
 Tōbu Railway – Tōbu Koizumi Line
 –  –

Highway

Sister city relations
  – Guaratinguetá, São Paulo, Brazil

Local attractions
 Koizumi Castle ruins (小泉城跡)
 Ryusenji temple (竜泉寺)
 Koizumi shrine (小泉神社)
 Ainohara remains (間之原遺跡) of Jōmon period (3500 BC-3000 BC)

References

External links

Official Website 

Brazilian communities
Towns in Gunma Prefecture
Ōizumi, Gunma